The CBC Regional Broadcast Centre in Vancouver, British Columbia, Canada, houses the Canadian Broadcasting Corporation's radio and television facilities in that city. It is the second largest CBC production facility in English Canada, and the third-largest overall, after Toronto's Canadian Broadcasting Centre and Montreal's Maison Radio-Canada. The building was designed by Paul Merrick for Merrick Architecture and built in 1975.

The building underwent significant renovations starting in 2006, which were completed in 2009. The expanded facility included community space to house the offices of the Vancouver International Jazz Festival, the Vancouver International Children's Festival and the Vancouver Folk Music Festival, as well as a  performance studio similar to Toronto's Glenn Gould Studio.

The building's address is 700 Hamilton Street in downtown Vancouver.

In addition to Vancouver's local CBC broadcast stations (CBU, CBU-FM, CBUF-FM, CBUX-FM, CBUT-DT, CBUFT-DT), the national satellite radio network CBC Radio 3 operates from the Vancouver building. It also serves as one of the originating studios for the nightly national newscast The National.

References

Buildings and structures completed in 1975
Vancouver
Buildings and structures in Vancouver
1975 establishments in British Columbia